Loughrea is a town in County Galway, Ireland. The town lies to the north of a range of wooded hills, the Slieve Aughty Mountains, and the lake from which it takes its name. The town's cathedral, St Brendan's, dominates the town's skyline. The town has increased in population in the late 20th and early 21st centuries. Although the town also serves as a commuter town for the city of Galway, it also remains an independent market town. Loughrea is the fourth most populous settlement in County Galway, with a population of 5,556 as of 2016.

Name 
The town takes its name from Loch Riach (Irish Riach being a variant of 'Riabhach' meaning grey/ speckled) The town is situated on the northern shore of the lake. The lake's Irish name is used in the name of the local Irish-language multi-faith primary school: Gaelscoil Riabhach. The town is located within an area that was historically called Trícha Máenmaige.

History

Pre-Norman
The town is located within an area that was historically called Trícha Máenmaige. This area was under the control of Ui Fhiachrach Fionn, and later by the Uí Maine. The area contains many examples of Gaelic and Early-Christian settlements. There is evidence of crannog settlements on the Lake of Loughrea with up to 14 individual Crannogs identified dating back to the 6th - 7th century AD.

Norman Settlement
The modern town was founded in 1236 by Richard de Burgo, an Anglo-Norman knight who built a castle along an ancient route between the River Shannon and the west coast. Today the remains of the medieval town wall, medieval priory, moat and a town gate are all still to be seen. The De Burgo family adopted Irish names and customs and assumed the role of chieftains in the following centuries until 1543 when Ulick "Bourck, alias Mac William," surrendered his lands to Henry VIII, receiving it back to hold, by English custom, with his new title, the Earl of Clanricarde.

Pre-Famine
By the 1700s Loughrea was a regional market and garrison town. During the Williamite War in Ireland, an attempt by Williamite forces to take Galway was defeated in a short skirmish at Loughrea.

Post-Famine
Loughrea was at the centre of the Gaelic Revival towards the end of the nineteenth century. The various elements of this revival in the town included Celtic-Revival Art, the Irish Literary Revival, Gaelic Athletics and the Irish language revival.

Independence 
Like many towns with garrisons, there was little support for the 1916 rebellion in Dublin, though some locals supported the rising in Galway. There was a Battalion of Irish Volunteers in Loughrea. They were not involved in any major battles and instead they mainly protected the local Sinn Féin Club members.

Twentieth-Century
The period from 1920 until 1960 saw Loughrea maintaining its role as a market town. The town is also the cathedral town of the Roman Catholic diocese of Clonfert and the twentieth century saw a number of large-scale religious events. The 1960s brought industrial developments such as the development of the Tynagh Mines.

Economy 
Loughrea was traditionally a farming town that cut its industrial teeth with the Tynagh mines,  to the east. There is now a gas-powered electricity power station on the site of the mines. As well as being a dormitory town for Galway, Loughrea now hosts a number of pharmaceutical and data-processing industries. Loughrea's tourist infrastructure is supported by several hotels, a country resort, as well as many bed-and-breakfasts, restaurants, coffee shops and pubs.

Demographics

Birthplace and Nationality 
4,270 of the population were born in Ireland, with 386 being born in the United Kingdom, 245 in Poland and Lithuania, 190 in the rest of the EU and 414 in the Rest of the World.

4,585 of the population are Irish nationals, with 143 being British, 257 Polish or Lithuanian, 198 other EU 28, 217 Rest of the World and 105 not stated.

Ethnicity 
White Irish are the largest ethnic group in Loughrea, with 4,011 of the population identifying as such, followed by Other White (703), White Irish Traveller (223), Asian or Asian Irish (189) and Black or Black Irish (77), with the rest identifying as other or not stating their ethnicity.

Religion 
Roman Catholicism is the most predominant religion in the town, with 4,331 residents identifying as Roman Catholic, followed by no religion (534) and Other Stated Religion (533)

Places of interest 

The Cathedral of St. Brendan on the lakeshore, in the town centre, is considered an important repository of Celtic-revival art and architecture in Ireland.
St. Brendan's Catholic Cathedral was designed by William Byrne in 1897 and completed five years later. Its double transepts are an unusual architectural feature. Spring-fed Loughrea Lake (Lough Rea) is overlooked by Knockash and fished for brown trout, pike and perch. There are also rudd, brook lamprey, three-spined stickleback, nine-spined stickleback and eels in the lake. The lake is home to many waterbirds. Migratory species from Europe live at the lake during the winter, and it provides nesting grounds for other species during the summer. The lake is listed as a site of international importance for the shoveler and a site of national importance for the coot and tufted duck. It is also used for water sports and swimming. Immediately behind the Loughrea boathouse are the remains of an old crannog. The Loughrea dwellers of another time would have sought protection from raiders by living in the comparative security provided by the lake.

There is a stone relief sculpture in town, on Millenium House, West Bridge, of Stoney Brennan's face. Brennan "according to legend, was hanged on Gallows’ Hill at Mount Carmel for stealing a turnip" during the 1700s.

Transport 
Loughrea is connected to the M6 Dublin-Galway motorway via the N65. The town was historically served by the Midland Great Western Railway and a railway branch from Attymon Junction, in use until 1975. This line was Ireland's last operational rural railway branch line, having outlasted most other country railway lines of this type by 10–20 years, and even surviving to have diesel trains used on it. The link road from the Ballinasloe - Galway motorway to Loughrea removed most of the remains of the original track bed. Loughrea railway station opened on 1 December 1890 and finally closed on 3 November 1975.

Sport and culture 

Loughrea GAA Club were 2006 winners of both the Galway and Connacht Senior Club Hurling Championships. They also reached the 2007 All-Ireland Club Hurling Championship final, losing out to Ballyhale Shamrocks. Loughrea has a rugby club, a soccer club, a Gaelic football club, a volleyball club, an 18-hole golf course, a cycling club and an athletic club. Loughrea cricket club is one of the leading clubs in Connacht. Actor Kiefer Sutherland has an affection for the town, twice visiting family as a young boy and is said to have been amazed at the skill of the players down at the handball alley.

Each year, in October, the town plays host to the BAFFLE International Poetry Festival.  Loughrea also boasts a Musical and Dramatic Society, historical society, and a community association. In the 2018 National Glór na nGael awards for "Irish language in local communities", Loughrea's "Gaeilge Locha Riach" was awarded best voluntary committee in Connaught. Gaeilge Locha Riach promotes the Irish language in Loughrea among the community and businesses. There is also a Foróige Youth club in the town.

Each year the Local Triathlon club called Predator organise a junior and senior triathlon event. The race was created by French coach Sebastien Locteau in 2006 with Tony Daly. Loughrea Triathlon is part of the national event calendar under Triathlon Ireland rules.

Notable people
 
 
Mark Boyle (born 1979), Irish social activist and writer also known as "The Moneyless Man" owing to his choice in 2008 to stop using money as he considers the concept of money harmful, he also gave up modern technology in 2016 after deciding that it was also part of the problem, Boyle though not born in Loughrea lives his moneyless, tech-less life near Loughrea
William Malachy Burke (1819–1879), Irish physician and Registrar General

Annalistic references

 797(802). The demolition of Loch Riach by Muirghius, son of Tomaltach.
 821. Fearghal, son of Catharnach, lord of Loch Riach, died.
 823. Fearghal, son of Cathasach, lord of Loch Riach, died.
 881. Cormac, son of Ceithearnach, Prior of Tir Da Ghlas and Cluain Fearta Brenainn, and the second lord who was over Loch Riach at that time, died.
 1408. O'h-Echeidhein was slain by the O'Dalys on the plain of Moinmoy.

See also 
 Frederick William Conway
 List of abbeys and priories in Ireland (County Galway)
 List of towns and villages in Ireland
 Marquis de St Ruth

References

External links 

 discoverloughrea.com - Discover Loughrea is your news, entertainment, sport and music website brought to you by Loughrea Chamber of Commerce
 Gaelscoil Riabhach: Loughrea's Gaelscoil
 Tourist Information for Loughrea: Provides information on Loughrea's attractions, activities and businesses.
 Gaeilge Locha Riach
 Loughrea Foróige
 THE LEAVING OF LOUGHREA - An Irish family in the Great Famine by Stephen Lally

Towns and villages in County Galway